Espinho is a Portuguese freguesia ("civil parish"), located in the municipality of Braga. The population in 2011 was 1,181, in an area of 4.48 km². The Sameiro Sanctuary is situated in Espinho.

References

Freguesias of Braga